The Liga Ouro de Basquete (LOB) (English: Gold Basketball League) is the second-tier level men's professional club basketball league in Brazil. It is organized by the Liga Nacional de Basquete (LNB) (National Basketball League), with the approval of the Confederação Brasileira de Basketball (CBB) (Brazilian Basketball Confederation).

History
The Liga Ouro de Basquete (Gold Basketball League) was founded by the Liga Nacional de Basquete (LNB) (National Basketball League), with the approval of the Confederação Brasileira de Basketball (CBB) (Brazilian Basketball Confederation), in November 2013. The first season of the competition was held in 2014. The number of teams competing in the league gradually increased over time. In the league's first 3 seasons (2014, 2015, 2016), there were only 4 teams participating. The number of teams was increased to 6 for the 2017 season, and to 9 for the 2018 season.

In October 2018, it was announced that the 2019 season would be the last season of the Liga Ouro de Basquete, and that a new competition, organized by the Brazilian Basketball Confederation (CBB), would replace it.

Format and competition system
The regular season of the Liga Ouro de Basquete is usually played in the first half of the year. During the first 3 editions of the league, when it had just 4 teams, the regular season ran under a system where all of the teams played each other four times each (two home games and two away games). The first placed team qualified for the league's Grand Finals automatically, and the second and third placed teams faced off to determine the other Grand Finals team. 

In 2018, with the increase of the number of teams in the league to 6, the format was changed to a system where all of the teams played each other twice (once at home, and once on the road). The first two placed teams qualified directly to the league's semifinals, while the third to sixth placed teams competed for the other two semifinals places. The league's playoffs begin shortly after the end of the regular season, with quarterfinals games played between the third and sixth placed teams in the league's final regular season standings. The quarterfinals are played in a three game series. The winners of the quarterfinals play the top two placed regular season teams in a best of five series format in the semifinals.

The Grand Finals is played in a best of five games format. The winner of the league's Grand Finals series is crowned the league's champion, and also earns a league promotion to Brazil's top-tier level league, the NBB, for the following season.

Finals

Titles by club

References

External links
Official website 
Liga Ouro de Basquete at Latinbasket.com

2014 establishments in Brazil
Liga
Brazil
Sports leagues established in 2014
Professional sports leagues in Brazil